Charles Dickson Greenhill (23 March 1902 – 14 August 1986) was a former Australian rules footballer who played with Carlton in the Victorian Football League (VFL).

Notes

External links 

Charlie Greenhill's profile at Blueseum

1902 births
1986 deaths
Australian rules footballers from Victoria (Australia)
Carlton Football Club players